Branko Hucika (born July 10, 1977) is a former Croatian football player.

Club statistics

References

External links

  
 Profile at footballjapan.jp
 Profile at odn.ne.jp

1977 births
Living people
Footballers from Zagreb
Association football midfielders
Croatian footballers
NK Hrvatski Dragovoljac players
Ulsan Hyundai FC players
Shonan Bellmare players
NK Čakovec players
Győri ETO FC players
NK Zagreb players
Tampines Rovers FC players
Polonia Warsaw players
NK HAŠK players
Croatian Football League players
K League 1 players
J2 League players
Nemzeti Bajnokság I players
Singapore Premier League players
Ekstraklasa players
Croatian expatriate footballers
Expatriate footballers in Poland
Expatriate footballers in South Korea
Expatriate footballers in Japan
Expatriate footballers in Hungary
Expatriate footballers in Singapore
Croatian expatriate sportspeople in Poland
Croatian expatriate sportspeople in Japan
Croatian expatriate sportspeople in South Korea
Croatian expatriate sportspeople in Hungary
Croatian expatriate sportspeople in Singapore